Romain Sardou (born 6 January 1974) is a French novelist born in Boulogne-Billancourt, Hauts-de-Seine. He is the son of the singer and songwriter Michel Sardou.

Biography

Romain Sardou was born of a long line of artists, singers, actors, writers, he developed a passion at an early young age for opera - he was just ten years old when he discovered his fascination for Richard Wagner. This precocious love led him to the discovery of the theater, then literature. His infatuation for reading quickly gained precedence over his love of music. He grew up among the works and lives of great authors whom he cherished. This passion is almost all-encompassing and was to stay with him for life.

He left high school in the year before graduation with the firm intention of becoming a playwright. He enrolled in theater classes - which he followed for three years - in order to better understand the mechanics involved in the art of stage craft and more clearly discern the acting profession. In parallel he engaged in numerous "writing exercises", all aimed at the theater. Unsatisfied, he settled in the country for four years during which he built up his book collection and read voraciously the works of historians. He then left the country to work for two years in Los Angeles, where he wrote scripts for children.

He eventually came back to France where he got married and wrote a successful first novel.

Romain Sardou is the father of three children (Aliénor, Gabriel & Victor-Scott). He wrote the tale entitled One Second Before Christmas for them.

Bibliography

 Pardonnez nos offenses (Forgive us our Sins) (2002 XO éditions)
 L'Eclat de Dieu (The Spark of God) (2004 XO éditions) (2005 Pocket)
 Une Seconde avant Noël (One second before Christmas) (2005 XO éditions)
 Personne n'y échappera (No One will get out) (2006 XO éditions)
 Sauver Noël (Save Christmas) (2006 XO éditions)
 Délivrez-nous du Mal (Deliver us From Evil) (2008 XO éditions)
 L'Arche de Noël & other tales (The Christmas Ark) (2008 XO éditions)
 Lots of Love, Scott & Scottie, letters 1936-1940 by Francis Scott Fitzgerald & daughter Scottie (Frances Scott Fitzgerald), Bernard Pascuito Editions, 2008 (Translation in French)
 Quitte Rome ou meurs, (XO éditions, 2009)
 America
Book 1 : La Treizième Colonie, (The Thirteenth Colony - Georgia (U.S. state)) (XO éditions, 2010)
Book 2 : La Main Rouge (The Red Hand) (XO éditions, 2012)
 Fräulein France, (XO éditions, 2014)
 Mademoiselle France, (Pocket, 2015)
 Maxence (Comics)
Book 1 : La Sédition Nika (Nika riots) Le Lombard, 2014, Romain Sardou & Carlos Rafael Duarte
Book 1 : La Sédition Nika (Nika riots) New Edition Le Lombard, 2016, Romain Sardou & Carlos Rafael Duarte
Book 2 : L'Augusta Le Lombard, 2016, Romain Sardou & Carlos Rafael Duarte
Book 3 : Le Cygne noir Le Lombard, Announced 2017, Romain Sardou & Carlos Rafael Duarte
 Ben (Kids)
Book 1 : Ben - Super-Héros dans le noir, written with Francesca Sardou, illustrated by Lili La Baleine, Hachette Jeunesse, 2016
Book 2 : Ben - Super-Héros de la politesse, written with Francesca Sardou, illustrated by Lili La Baleine, Hachette Jeunesse, 2016
Book 3 : Ben - Super-Héros sans tototte, written with Francesca Sardou, illustrated by Lili La Baleine, Hachette Jeunesse, 2016
Book 4 : Ben - Super-Héros au grand coeur, written with Francesca Sardou, illustrated by Lili La Baleine, Hachette Jeunesse, 2016
 Un Homme averti ne vaut rien (Forewarned is not forearmed) (september 2016 XO éditions)

Forgive us our Sins

It was an unusually cold winter in 1284. The "chill winds of the Devil" isolate the small diocese of Draguan, in the county of Toulouse from the rest of the world.

Before the sight of the statue of the Virgin Mary broken by the cold, Romée de Haquin, its bishop, is not far from thinking that a curse is wreaking havoc on his parishes. Everything started when two young girls found the remains of tortured bodies in the river.

The savage murder of Haquin leaves the village prey to irrational fears. It is at this point that a mysterious priest, Henno Gui, makes his entrance. Accompanied by a young boy and by a hideously ugly man, he had been summoned by Haquin to take charge of the thirteenth parish of the diocese, Heurteloup. After three days of walking in a forest which is as dark as it is inextricable, the group reaches the entrance of a deserted village. The church is in ruins and many houses are abandoned. Surrounded by foul-smelling marshlands and suspected of carrying the plague, the parish has lived in oblivion for decades. Nobody knows what had happened to its inhabitants.

The cursed parish, the thirteenth of the bishopric, is so isolated that its name is often omitted from the maps of the provostship, but it does however interest the highest echelons in Rome. The Holy See is full of rumours, and agitations in the most secret inner circles of the Vatican have had repercussions as far afield as the kingdom of France. Maybe the key to these mysteries can be found in the troubled life of Romée de Haquin, or with Henno Gui, the priest with the strange methods, or found at the very heart of the thirteenth parish?

Historical Characters in the Novel 

 Pope Martin IV

The Spark of God

Deep beneath Jerusalem, from the beginning of time, lies an object that could change the world: the Spark of God.

At least that is what nine knights, willing to risk their lives in the attempt to recover it, believe. And when, in 1099, the long-awaited news of the liberation of Jerusalem comes at last, the knights promise their aid and protection to the thousands of pilgrims who set off for the Holy Land. They set about organising a vast pilgrimage, which will enable them to conceal their true aim.

But just before they set off, one of them is murdered. Whether by accident or by design, he leaves a packet of letters about the secret buried deep in the Holy Land - a secret known to King Solomon – for his nephew Cosimo to find. Soon the young man discovers that his uncle had organised everything as if in the knowledge that he would never return from the Holy Land. Why?

Cosimo determines to find out. Unbeknownst to everyone, he insinuates himself into one of the groups of pilgrims.

What will they be searching for in Jerusalem?

And now, imagine that the story of this novel is situated either in the past or in the future. But is it really the past and the future? And if it is, then why does everything happen in the same way?

Historical Characters in the Novel 

 Bernard of Clairvaux
 Hugues de Payens
 Baldwin II of Jerusalem
 Robert de Craon
 Godfrey de Saint-Omer
 Andre de Montbard

Historical Places in the Novel
Jerusalem
Troyes
Clairvaux Abbey
County of Champagne
Constantinople

See also 
Knights Templar
Solomon's Temple
First Crusade
Pilgrimage
Uchronie
Time travel in fiction

One Second before Christmas

"How does Santa Claus deliver all his packages at once?.... Where is his factory?... Who makes the gifts?... How does it all really work?"
These questions about the wonderment and mechanics of Christmas are the farthest thing possible from the thoughts of young Harold on the 16th of October, 1851. Harold is an orphan and street urchin in the sad, gray industrial never-town of Cokecuttle, in Lancashire, England – and he does not suspect the exceptional adventure awaiting him….

Indeed, Harold is about to be called to duty as the new Santa Claus, delivering presents and happiness to his fellow children around the world. He’s given the familiar red suit and a big white beard, too. And he’s set to task.

But… how does Santa Claus deliver all those packages in one night? What about the elves and reindeer? Our little Harold will have to find a very quick answer to those questions after all.

Places in this Christmas Tale

Lancashire
Equuleus
North Pole
Aberdeenshire

See also

Victorian era
Industrial Revolution
Child labor
Chimney sweep

References
XO Editions
Susana Lea Associates
Random House

External links
 Romain Sardou’s Website

1974 births
Living people
People from Boulogne-Billancourt
Writers from Île-de-France
French historical novelists
French science fiction writers
21st-century French novelists
French male novelists
21st-century French male writers